Ocala International Airport  is five miles west of Ocala, in Marion County, Florida. It is also known as Ocala International Airport-Jim Taylor Field and was previously Ocala Regional Airport or Jim Taylor Field.

The airport is about 31 miles south of Gainesville Regional Airport.

Facilities
It has two asphalt runways: runway 18/36 is 7,467 by 150 feet (2,276 x 46 m) and runway 8/26 is 3,009 by 50 feet (917 x 15 m).

The airport opened in the early 1960s, replacing the previous Taylor Field just southwest of Ocala. Its 5000-ft runway was served by Eastern Airlines, with one Convair 440 flight a day with a routing of Jacksonville (JAX) - Gainesville (GNV) - Ocala (OCF) - Vero Beach (VRB) - Miami (MIA) and return. Eastern later operated Lockheed L-188 Electra turboprop service with the last Electra flight leaving Ocala in 1972.

Later scheduled passenger airline service included:

 Air Florida – Boeing 737, Boeing 727 and Douglas DC-9 jet service to Miami, Tampa, Orlando, Jacksonville and Gainesville
 USAir Express (operated by Allegheny Commuter) – Beechcraft turboprops to Orlando
 Skyway Commuter – Beechcraft turboprops and Piper prop service to Gainesville and Orlando

The last airline flight left Ocala in 1987 when USAir Express pulled out. Airport facilities were then expanded to include a 3,000 foot crosswind runway, an extension of the main runway to 6,900 feet, an instrument landing approach, and FAA Part 139 certification. Scheduled passenger airline service is unlikely to return to Ocala.

In 2004 a $1.3 million plan was put in motion to upgrade apron security systems. The airport is the first in the state to use the Polycon pavement surface treatment.

For the year ending October 31, 2022 the airport had 58,465 aircraft operations, average 160 per day: 95% general aviation, 3% air taxi, 1% military, and <1% commercial. 146 aircraft were then based at the airport: 101 single-engine, 20 multi-engine, 15 jet, 9 helicopter, and 1 glider.

In May 2009 construction began on an air traffic control tower. The tower was certified and staffed as an FAA Level I contract control tower in summer 2010. A new terminal building was completed in the spring of 2020.

Current facilities on site include:

 Avis Car Rental
 Elevation 89 Restaurant
 Enterprise Car Rental
 Epic Flight Academy
 Ocala Aviation
 Sheltair Aviation

In popular culture
In 2012, John Travolta and Olivia Newton-John released a Christmas album containing the track "I Think You Might Like It", whose music video features the FBO at the airport. Travolta lives nearby, at the Jumbolair fly-in community, which also makes an appearance in the video.

References

External links 
 Ocala International Airport, official site
 

Airports in Florida
Airports established in 1968
Buildings and structures in Ocala, Florida
Transportation buildings and structures in Marion County, Florida
1968 establishments in Florida